King Edward VI School is a co-educational comprehensive secondary school in Bury St Edmunds, Suffolk, England. The school in its present form was created in 1972 by the merging of King Edward VI Grammar School, with the Silver Jubilee Girls School and the Silver Jubilee Boys School (founded 1935). The school occupies the site of the former Silver Jubilee schools in Grove Road, Bury St Edmunds.

History

King Edward VI School was founded about 1550 and has occupied a number of sites in the town prior to moving to the current location in 1972. In 1550 lands were given to provide funds for a "scole ther to be founded by the kinges Maiestie in the like manner as the school at Sherbourne".

King Edward VI School celebrated the 450th anniversary of its foundation in 2000. The charter with Edward's seal is in the National Archives in Kew, together with documents and books from the early years of the school's existence. One of these is the list of rules for the masters and boys. Originally a grammar school for boys, who studied Greek, Latin and religious instruction, it has moved to various different sites in the town all of which are marked with plaques donated by the Old Burians' Association.

The oldest and rarest of the Grammar School's books and records are now deposited in the Cambridge University Library, including the psalter which had survived from the Abbey of St Edmund. The University Library has a collection of more than 500 books belonging to the school. Some of the books were used by teachers and students – texts in Latin and Greek, stories, the plays of Shakespeare – and some were donated to the school by former students.

Having been a foundation grammar school since its foundation in 1550 the school surrendered some of its independence in 1922 when it became a Direct Grant School, meaning an annual grant was paid to the school by the Board of Education for each boy above the preparatory department, provided an agreed percentage of free place boys were admitted each year. In 1944 with the enactment of the 1944 Education Act, the governors of the school decided that they could no longer meet the financial demand necessary to meet the requirement of the Act in order to maintain charity and thereby Direct Grant status, given the requirements for improved facilities for curriculum delivery that the Act demanded. Accordingly, in August 1946 the school became a Voluntary Controlled School under the aegis of the West Suffolk County Council Education Committee.

In 1970 Suffolk County Council implemented a three tier comprehensive system in the west of the county. The school merged with the Silver Jubilee Boys and Girls Schools to form Kind Edward VI Upper School, moving to the Grove Road site of the Silver Jubilee schools. The Vinefields grammar school site became the home of St James Middle School. The middle school closed following the creation of a new 11 to 18 school system in west Suffolk.

World Wars

In common with schools of its type King Edward's has lost many old boys in war. Four Old Burians were killed in the Boer War, and thirty-two in WW1. On 4 February 1921 a memorial bearing the names of 32 old boys killed in the Great War was dedicated in the Cathedral at Bury St Edmunds. Twenty nine old boys gave their lives in WW2 and a memorial those former pupils was place close to the existing WW1 memorial in 1949. Both memorials were designed by Basil Oliver, an old boy of the school.

King Edward VI School Today
The current school remains a Voluntary Controlled Church of England school and accepts Students from ages 11 to 18, it is attended by approximately 1400 pupils. It is a specialist sports college and is a Training school for new teachers. Since 2008, the school has also been partnered with Shanghai Yangjing-Juyan Experimental School in China to develop international links and exchanges between the schools have occurred.

The school was rated "Good" in its 2014 Ofsted Inspection and the school achieved a 77% 9-4 pass rate at GCSE and a 99% pass rate at A Level in 2018. A further inspection in 2019 maintained the "Good" rating with pupils judged to be making above average progress.

In 2016 the school became 11 to 18 institution admitting pupils in years 7, 8 and 9. The school has since become an 11 to 16 institution with the opening of the Abbeygate 6th Form College in Bury St Edmunds.

Since September 2011 until September 2022, the school had operated a house system and incorporated vertical tutoring. The school's house system operated through six 'Colleges' which have been developed to create smaller learning communities. The Colleges, all named after Suffolk places with significant heritage, were Elveden, Hengrave, Ickworth, Kentwell, Melford and Wyken.

The Old Burians Association
There is an alumni association known as The Old Burians. The Old Burians Charitable Trust, set up in 1997, provides financial support to Sixth Formers for personal development projects.

Headteachers

1553–c1560 John Fenn (deprived of office)
c1670 Edward Leedes
1788 –1809 Michael Thomas Becher
1809–1828 Benjamin Heath Malkin
1828–1841 John Edwards
1841–1855 John William Donaldson
1855–1879 Albert Henry Wratislaw
1879–1890 Charles Sankey (left to become a House Master at Harrow)
1890–1894 James Peile
 1894–1908 Arthur Wright Callis
 1908–1911 E T England
 1911–1923 B S Richards
 1923–1940? J M Wadmore
 1940?–1970 Robert Elliott
 1970–1981 David Pullen (died in office)
 1981–2002 Michael W Moran
 2002–2017 Geoff Barton (subsequently General Secretary of the Association of School and College Leaders)
 2017–2021 Lee Walker
 2021–2022 Beverley Tucker and Tom Grey (interim)
 2022–present Deri O'Regan

Notable Old Burians

Chris Auchinvole – New Zealand politician
John Battely – Archdeacon of Canterbury
Charles James Blomfield – Bishop of London
Edward Valentine Blomfield – classicist
Edmund Boulnois – businessman and politician
Horace Browne – cricketer and barrister
John Burroughs – architect
Robert Butts – Bishop of Ely
Charlie Carrel – Professional poker player and coach
Thomas Clerke – MP
Thomas Collins – cricketer
Richard Cumberland – dramatist
Thomas Curteis – cricketer and clergyman
Sir Charles Davers – politician
Robert Dewing – cricketer and army officer
Edward FitzGerald – Poet and Translator of Rubáiyát of Khayyám
Roy Flatt – dean of Argyll and The Isles
Edward Greene – founder of Greene King brewery
Charles Jenyns – cricketer
John Mitchell Kemble – historian
Basil Charles King – geologist
Jack Lankester – professional footballer
General Charles Lee – general in US Continental Army
William Mather – cricketer
Dudley Long North – politician
Henry Perkins – cricketer, brother of the below
John Perkins – cricketer, brother of the above
Jocelyn Pook – musician and composer
James Poulson – cricketer
Edward Romilly – cricketer, MP for Ludlow and Chairman of the Board of Audit
William Sancroft – 79th Archbishop of Canterbury
Richard Sibbes – Puritan theologian
Mercer Simpson – writer
Mark Smith – Vice Chancellor of Lancaster University
Sir William Spring, Bt – politician
Stephen Spring Rice - philanthropist
George Pretyman Tomline – theologian and Bishop of Lincoln
Ed Upson – professional footballer
Chris Walker-Hebborn - Commonwealth Games gold medallist swimmer
John Walsham – diplomat
Sir Thomas Watson – President of Royal College of Physicians, physician to queen
John Winthrop the Younger – governor of Connecticut
Frank Wise – diplomat economist and politician; Labour MP, 1929–31

References

External links

Old Burians
King Edward VI School

1550 establishments in England
Educational institutions established in the 1550s
Secondary schools in Suffolk
Training schools in England
Church of England secondary schools in the Diocese of St Edmundsbury and Ipswich
Voluntary controlled schools in England
Bury St Edmunds
King Edward VI Schools